David Siegel may refer to:

 David A. Siegel (born 1935), American businessman and founder and CEO of Westgate Resorts
 David Siegel (musician) (born 1973), American musician
 David Siegel (screenwriter), American film director and screenwriter, known for Bee Season (2005)
 Dave Siegel (One Life to Live)
 David D. Siegel (1931–2014), American law professor and legal commentator
 David Siegel (executive), CEO of Investopedia and Meetup
 David Siegel (entrepreneur) (born 1959), American entrepreneur
David Siegel (computer scientist) (born 1961), American computer scientist and co-founder of Two Sigma

See also
David Segal (disambiguation)